The Wolf Prize in Chemistry is awarded annually by the Wolf Foundation in Israel. It is one of the six Wolf Prizes established by the Foundation and awarded since 1978; the others are in Agriculture, Mathematics, Medicine, Physics and Arts.

The Wolf Prize in Chemistry is considered to be one of the most prestigious international chemistry awards, behind only the Nobel Prize in Chemistry. Becoming a Wolf Prize laureate has been viewed as a potential precursor to receiving the Nobel Prize. As of 2022, 12 awardees have subsequently become Nobel laureates; the most recent of those is Carolyn Bertozzi, who received the Nobel Prize the same year.

Laureates

Laureates per country 
Below is a chart of all laureates per country (updated to 2023 laureates). Some laureates are counted more than once if have multiple citizenship.

See also

 List of chemistry awards

Notes and references

External links 
 
 
 
 Jerusalempost Israel-Wolf-Prizes 2016
 Jerusalempost Israel-Wolf-Prizes 2017
 Jerusalempost Wolf-Prizes 2018
 Wolf Prize 2019

 Chemistry
Chemistry awards
Lists of Israeli award winners
Awards established in 1978
Israeli science and technology awards
1978 establishments in Israel